Science Education at the Crossroads is an annual national academic conference, initially funded by the National Science Foundation, designed to enable various stakeholders in science education to confer in a legitimate and productive manner.  The conference also claims to offer an alternative to the standard model of conferring and professional development.   Conference creators and coordinators are John Settlage of the University of Connecticut and Adam Johnston of Weber State University.

Philosophy
Many organizations and conferences exist for science educators.  These include the National Science Teachers Association (NSTA), the National Association for Research in Science Teaching (NARST), the Association for Science Teacher Education (ASTE), and many others dedicated to specific fields (e.g., physics and chemistry) within science education.  While these organizations are adept at presenting research results or at sharing innovations in teaching, organizers and many participants in Crossroads feel that none of them provide a means for new research questions, policy directives, or general science education goals to be discussed and deliberated.

Crossroads uses the Vexation and Venture format for conference sessions in which an "Incubator Forum" allows for an interactive, discussion based and dynamic intersection of views. This mode of interaction has been shown to engage presenters and participants in a way that new ideas and problems can be proposed, and the group takes on responsibility for a generative session.  In this format, problems (vexations) are dissected and their possible specific solutions (ventures) are proposed.  In this manner, the process of research and innovation is presented in a public forum in its early development stages, rather than after its completion, as would be the case in other academic conference formats.

Participants represent backgrounds from science and education, and represent perspectives from classroom teaching, policy, and research. This variety of perspectives allows each participant to tap into expertise that they might not otherwise encounter within the typical course of their professional lives. In this regard the metaphor of a crossroads describes a culture and place where people can meet.

History
Crossroads originated from a disenchantment with more traditional education conferences.  As a consequence, Crossroads was designed, utilizing the Vexation and Venture format, to make generative discussions a deliberate feature of the conference.

Crossroads has a history of finding a specific place and space each year for conferring.  Oscillating from venue to venue has allowed each year to have its own character, as well as allow people from specific regions to have more access to the conference.  Crossroads has been held at the following venues:
 Storrs, CT (2005)
 Ogden, UT (2006)
 Amherst, MA (2007)
 Alta, UT (2008)
 Portland, OR (2009)
 San Antonio, TX (2011)
 Providence, RI (2012)
 Portlandia (2014)
 Cleveland, OH (2015)

Crossroads has a history of inviting poets as keynotes to its conferences.  These have included:
 Taylor Mali (2005)
 Jimmy Santiago Baca, joined by Jason Yurcic (2006)
 Marilyn Nelson (2007)
 David Lee (2008)
 Lawson Fusao Inada (2009)
 Naomi Shihab Nye (2011)

Additionally, illustrator/artist/educator Fred Lynch contributed the keynote address in 2012.

Crossroads has also established a line of work that has called for scholarly work in science education to reach out to create significant impact in education.  This has been referred to as "scholar activism" by David Moss, Crossroads' first keynote speaker in 2005.  Other speakers have included John Settlage in 2006, Adam Johnston in 2007, Heidi Carlone in 2008, and Magnia George in 2009.  Conference organizers have contributed joint addresses in 2011 and 2012.

Future
Science Education at the Crossroads has moved its conference each fall, from east to west and back again, through the year 2009. Most notably, National Science Foundation funding was established to fund the conference from 2007 - 2009.  In 2010, the conference organizers are considering next steps for future sequences of the event.

See also
 Vexation and Venture conference format

External links
 Science Education at the Crossroads main site

References

Science education
Educational research